LA-MSS was a Portuguese UCI Continental cycling team originally based in Maia, Portugal, later in Póvoa de Varzim, that disbanded by mid 2008 after a police raid at the headquarters.

The team received wildcard invitations to the Vuelta a España in 1996, 1997, 2001, 2002 and 2003.

Major wins

1998
 Portuguese National Road Race, Carlos Carneiro
 Overall Troféu Joaquim Agostinho, José Azevedo
Stage 3 & 5, José Azevedo
Stage 5 Volta a Portugal, José Azevedo
2004
 Mountains classification Volta ao Algarve, Gonçalo Amorim
Stage 5 Setmana Catalana de Ciclisme, Ángel Edo
 Overall GP MR Cortez-Mitsubishi, Ángel Edo
Points classification, Ángel Edo
Stage 1, Ángel Edo
Stage 3 & 4, Pedro Cardoso
 Mountains classification Volta ao Alentejo, Bruno Pires
Stage 2, Hugo Sabido
 Overall Troféu Joaquim Agostinho, David Bernabeu
Team classification
Stage 2, Ángel Edo
 Overall Volta a Portugal, David Bernabeu
Team classification
Team classification Tour de Pologne
Stage 7, Hugo Sabido
2005
Stage 3 Volta ao Algarve, Alexei Markov
Team classification GP Internacional do Oeste/RTP
Stages 2 & 4, Alexei Markov
 Overall GP CTT Correios de Portugal, Alexei Markov
 Points classification, Alexei Markov
Stage 1 & 2, Alexei Markov
Team classification Troféu Joaquim Agostinho
 Points classification, Danail Petrov
 Mountains classification, Danail Petrov
Stage 1, Alexei Markov
Stage 3, Danail Petrov
2006
Mountains classification GP Costa Azul, Danail Petrov
 Overall Volta ao Algarve, João Cabreira
Team classification
Stage 5, João Cabreira
 Mountains classification GP CTT Correios de Portugal, Pedro Cardoso
 Portuguese Road Race Championship, Bruno Pires
 Overall Troféu Joaquim Agostinho, Danail Petrov
Stage 3, Danail Petrov
Stage 7 Volta a Portugal, João Cabreira
2007
Stage 4 Volta ao Alentejo, Bruno Pires
Team classification GP Rota dos Móveis
Stage 4, Bruno Pires
 Overall GP CTT Correios de Portugal, Pedro Cardoso
Team classification
 Overall Troféu Joaquim Agostinho, Xavier Tondo
Team classification
Prologue, Xavier Tondo
 Overall Volta a Portugal, Xavier Tondo
2008
Team classification Volta ao Alentejo
Stage 4, Bruno Pires
Subida al Naranco, Xavier Tondo
 Overall Vuelta a Asturias, Ángel Vicioso
Team classification
Stage 1, Ángel Vicioso
 Overall GP Rota dos Móveis, Constantino Zaballa
Team classification
 Points classification, Ángel Vicioso
Stage 3, Constantino Zaballa
 Portuguese Road Race Championship, João Cabreira
Team classification Vuelta a la Comunidad de Madrid
 Points classification, Ángel Vicioso
 Sprints classification, José Antonio Garrido
Stage 2, Ángel Vicioso

National champions
1996
 Portuguese Time Trial Championship, José Azevedo
1997
 Portuguese Time Trial Championship, José Azevedo
1998
 Portuguese Road Race Championship, Carlos Alberto Carneiro
1999
 Portuguese Road Race Championship, Carlos Alberto Carneiro
2002
 Portuguese Road Race Championship, Rui Lavarinhas
2004
 Portuguese Road Race Championship, Bruno Castanheira
2006
 Portuguese Road Race Championship, Bruno Pires
2008
 Portuguese Road Race Championship, João Cabreira

Team roster

References

External links
  Maia Milaneza-website

Maia
Maia Milaneza
Cycling teams established in 1991
Cycling teams disestablished in 2008
1991 establishments in Portugal
Maia, Portugal